Al Hill may refer to:
 Al Hill (actor) (1892–1954), American character actor
 Al Hill (ice hockey) (born 1955), Canadian ice hockey player
 Al Hill, pseudonym used by some of the American lyricists of "Let Me Go, Lover!", a popular song released in 1954

See also 
 Alan Hill (disambiguation)
 Albert Hill (disambiguation)
 Alex Hill (disambiguation)
 Alexander Hill (disambiguation)
 Alexandra Hill (disambiguation)
 Alfred Hill (disambiguation)